Le Marinel is a surname. It may refer to:

 Georges Le Marinel (1860–1914), Belgian soldier, engineer, explorer and colonial administrator
 Matthew Le Marinel (1883–1963), Jersey Anglican clergyman, who became Dean of Jersey
 Paul Le Marinel (1858–1912), officer in the Belgian army who became an explorer and administrator in the Congo Free State